Jeffrey "Jeff" Hayenga (born 1950) is an American actor, writer, and producer known for his role in Star Trek: The Next Generation.

Early life and education 
Hayenga was born in Sibley, Iowa. He received his training at the University of Minnesota.

Career 
He has appeared in a number of films, including And the Band Played On (1993), Other People's Money (1991), The Prince of Pennsylvania, Center Stage (2000), and Memro (2004).

His New York theater credits include title roles in Broadway's The Elephant Man, and off-Broadway's Jeffrey, as well as The Man Who Came to Dinner, Ah Wilderness, As Bees In Honey Drown, Sister Mary Ignatius Explains It All For You, Jeffrey, Two Rooms, Hamlet, King Lear and The Book of Wren, to name just a few.

Hayenga made two guest appearances in Star Trek spin-off series.

Filmography

Acting

Film

Television

Writing

Television

References

External links 

Living people
1950 births
People from Iowa